The Most Illustrious Order of Tri Shakti Patta (Order of the Three Divine Powers) is an order of knighthood of the former Kingdom of Nepal. It is conferred on members of the Royal Family or Nepali citizens who make outstanding contributions to the nation, and to foreigners making special contributions to the welfare of Nepal.

History 
The medal was first instituted by King Tribhuvan Bir Bikram Shah Dev in 1936. The order was later instituted on 27 November 1937 by King Tribhuvan.

After the end of the monarchy in 2008, the new government initiated this new series of awards. Nepal Ratna Man Padavi is the highest class whereas Rastra Gaurav Man Padavi is second highest. The award is conferred by the President of Nepal on Republic Day, May 29.

Insignia
The ribbon of the order is navy blue with white-edged green edges.

Grades
The Order of Tri Shakti Patta has five classes & a Medal :
 Member First Class (Jyotirmaya-Subikhyat-Tri-Shakti-Patta)
 Member Second Class (Subikhyat-Tri-Shakti-Patta)
 Member Third Class (Bikhyat-Tri-Shakti-Patta)
 Member Fourth Class (Prakhyat-Tri-Shakti-Patta)
 Member Fifth Class (Tri-Shakti-Patta)
 Medal (Tri-Shakti-Patta-Padak)

References

External links
 World Medals Index, Nepal: Order of Trishakti Patta

 
Tri Shakti Patta, Order of
Tri Shakti Patta, Order of
1937 establishments in Nepal
2006 disestablishments in Nepal